James Shurrade Jackson (born August 4, 1976) is a former American football running back in the National Football League. He was drafted in the third round of the 2001 NFL Draft. He played for the Cleveland Browns, the Green Bay Packers, and the Arizona Cardinals.

Jackson played collegiate football at the University of Miami. James has two younger siblings, Terrence and Daelynn Hicks.

References

1976 births
Living people
People from Belle Glade, Florida
Players of American football from Florida
Sportspeople from the Miami metropolitan area
American football running backs
Miami Hurricanes football players
Cleveland Browns players
Green Bay Packers players
Arizona Cardinals players